Brawhm Pass is a small pass on the east side of Farnell Valley in Victoria Land. The pass provides easy passage between Beacon Valley and Arena Valley. The name was recommended in 1968 by the New Zealand Antarctic Place-Names Committee. It is derived from the names of six party members of the University of New South Wales expeditions of 1964–65 and 1966–67 who used this pass, that is, Bryan, Rose, Anderson, William, Hobbs and McElroy.

References
 

Mountain passes of Victoria Land
Scott Coast